The following list of historic places in Palmerston North contains buildings and structures listed in the New Zealand Historic Places Trust in Palmerston North, New Zealand.

List of historic places

External links 
Heritage New Zealand: Search the List

 
 
Palmerston North